Silver Street Bridge, officially known as Small Bridge is the sixth river Cam bridge overall and the second bridge on its middle stream in Cambridge. In 1959 the concrete bridge with the design by Sir Edwin Lutyens replaced an 1841 cast iron bridge.

See also
List of bridges in Cambridge
Template:River Cam map

References

Bridges in Cambridge
Bridges across the River Cam
Road bridges in England
Arch bridges in England
Bridges completed in 1959